Daffin House is a historic home located at Hillsboro, Caroline County, Maryland, United States. It is a large, 2½-story brick structure built about 1780. Attached is a two-part, 1½-story Flemish bond brick wing built about 1760, with a dormered gable roof. It was constructed by Charles Daffin who received a patent for the land in 1784 under the name of Daffin's Farm.

Future president Andrew Jackson met Charles Dickinson here in 1796. Jackson would later kill Dickinson in a duel at Adairville, Kentucky.

Daffin House was listed on the National Register of Historic Places in 1975.

References

External links
, including undated photo, at Maryland Historical Trust

Houses in Caroline County, Maryland
Houses on the National Register of Historic Places in Maryland
Houses completed in 1760
Federal architecture in Maryland
National Register of Historic Places in Caroline County, Maryland